, there were about 299,000 electric vehicles registered in South Korea. , 11.8% of new cars registered in South Korea were electric.

Charging stations
, there were 170,000 public charging stations in South Korea.

Manufacturing
, South Korea was the world's fourth-largest exporter of electric vehicles.

By province or city

Gyeonggi
, there were 548 public DC charging stations in Gyeonggi Province.

Seoul
, there were 35,216 public charging stations in Seoul.

Ulsan
, there were 4,184 electric vehicles registered in Ulsan.

, there were 1,992 public charging stations in Ulsan.

References

Korea, South
Road transport in South Korea